The Skyblade is a man-portable mini-UAV developed by ST Aerospace, designed to be used by two operators for short-range battlefield or tactical reconnaissance and artillery spotting.

Models
Skyblade I: Prototype version. Jointly developed with local research house (DSO National Laboratories)
Skyblade II: Advance Production exploration, gasoline engine. Completely in-house developed. Didn't make it to full production.
Skyblade III: Production version, all electric systems. Jointly developed with local research house (DSO National Laboratories)
The Skyblade III is designed for rapid 2-man deployment to support military and civilian applications. Developed for fully autonomous flight operations, it delivers quick and accurate intelligence in real-time to tactical commanders in the field.
Skyblade IV: New tactical UAV
The SkyBlade IV is a completely new close-range tactical UAV unveiled in Asian Aerospace 2006, with a takeoff weight of 50 kilograms (110 pounds), including a 12 kilogram (26 pound) payload, a torpedo-like fuselage, a straight high-mounted wing with upturned wingtips, cruciform tailfins and a pusher prop driven by a piston engine with an endurance of up to 12 hours. The UAV carries an EO-IR sensor system with STA working on a miniaturized SAR. The vehicle is catapult launched and is recovered via parachutes or catch nets.
Skyblade IV can perform a variety of operational missions such as surveillance, reconnaissance, fire support and battle damage assessment.

Military use in Singapore 
Since 2010, six army units of the Singapore Armed Forces are equipped with the Skyblade III variant for scout and field intelligence gathering. The units are: the 40th Battalion of the Singapore Armoured Regiment (40 SAR), 41 SAR, 2 Singapore Infantry Regiment (2 SIR), 3 SIR, 3rd Singapore Infantry Brigade (3 SIB), and the 4th Singapore Armoured Brigade (4 SAB).

Specifications
Skyblade II prototype
Length: 1.2 m (4 ft)
Wing span: 1.8 m (6 ft)
Operating altitude: 458 m (1500 ft)
Endurance (minimum) (depending on internal combustion or electric version): 1-2 hrs
Stall speed: 18 kts (33 km/h)
Maximum speed: 70 kts (130 km/h)
Operating wind conditions: 20 kts (37 km/h)
Head wind during take-off and landing: 15 kts (28 km/h)
Cross wind during take-off and landing: 10 kts (18 km/h)
Range: up to 8 km line-of-sight

Skyblade III specifications
Length: 1.4 m
Wing Span: 2.6 m
Maximum Take Off Weight: 5.0 kg 
Endurance: >60 mins
Operating Altitude: 300 - 1,500 ft (90- 460m)
Maximum Speed: 35 kts
Range: 8 km 
Flight Operation: Fully autonomous from launch to mission execution to recovery

Skyblade IV specifications
Length: 2.4 m
Wing Span: 3.7 m
Maximum Take Off Weight: 70 kg
Maximum Payload Weight: 12 kg
Endurance: 6 – 12 hrs
Maximum Altitude: 15,000 ft [4,572 m]
Operating Speed: 50 -80 kts
Range: 100 km
Launch: Catapult
Recovery: Parachute
Flight Operation: Fully autonomous

References

Skyblade III on the ST Aerospace web site
Skyblade IV on the ST Aerospace web site
Speech by Defence Minister on DSO joint collaboration Skyblade
DSO Technologies on DSO National Laboratories website
DSO joint collaboration Skyblade
ST-DSO joint collaboration on Skyblade class UAVs

Unmanned aerial vehicles of Singapore
Airborne military robots
Military equipment of Singapore
Skyblade